Rhodoprasina floralis is a species of moth of the  family Sphingidae. It is known from northern India and Nepal.

The larvae have been recorded feeding on Acer campbelli.

References

Rhodoprasina
Moths described in 1876